Angela Dorn-Rancke (born 2 June 1982) is a German politician of Alliance 90/The Greens who has been serving as the State Minister for Higher Education, Research, Science and the Arts of Hesse in the cabinet of Minister-President Volker Bouffier since 18 January 2019.

Political career
In the 2009 elections, Dorn-Rancke was elected into the State Parliament of Hesse, at the time as the youngest member of legislative.

From 2017 to 2019, Dorn-Rancke served as co-chair of her party of the Green Party in Hesse, alongside Kai Klose.

In the negotiations to form a so-called traffic light coalition of the Social Democratic Party (SPD), the Green Party and the Free Democrats (FDP) following the 2021 German elections, Dorn-Rancke was part of her party's delegation in the working group on innovation and research, co-chaired by Thomas Losse-Müller, Katharina Fegebank and Lydia Hüskens.

Other activities 
 Cultural Foundation of the German States (KdL), Member of the Council
 Fritz Bauer Institute, Member of the Board
 Hessische Kulturstiftung, Ex-Officio Member of the Board of Trustees (since 2019)
 Peace Research Institute Frankfurt (HSFK), chair of the Board of Trustees 
 University Hospital Frankfurt, Goethe University Frankfurt, Ex-Officio Member of the Board of Trustees
 Vietnamese-German University (VGU), Member of the University Council (since 2019)
 Von-Behring Röntgen Foundation, Ex-Officio Member of the Board of Trustees (since 2019)
 German Federation for the Environment and Nature Conservation (BUND)
 Medico International, Member
 Hessischer Rundfunk, Member of the Broadcasting Council (–2019)

References 

1982 births
Living people
Members of the Landtag of Hesse
Women ministers of State Governments in Germany